Louis Rudolph (22 July 1671 – 1 March 1735), a member of the House of Welf, was Duke of Brunswick-Lüneburg and ruling Prince of Wolfenbüttel from 1731 until his death. Since 1707, he ruled as an immediate Prince of Blankenburg.

Louis Rudolph was the maternal grandfather of Empress Maria Theresa I, The Holy Roman Empress, Emperor Peter II of Russia and Charles I, Duke of Brunswick-Wolfenbüttel, and maternal great-grandfather of Emperor Ivan VI of Russia.

Life
Louis Rudolph was the youngest son of Duke Anthony Ulrich of Brunswick-Wolfenbüttel and his consort Princess Elisabeth Juliane of Schleswig-Holstein-Sonderburg-Norburg, daughter of Duke Frederick of Schleswig-Holstein-Sonderburg-Norburg. He became a major general in the service of the Habsburg emperor Leopold I in 1690 and was promptly captured in the Battle of Fleurus by the forces of King Louis XIV of France. After being released the same year, his father gave him the Brunswick County of Blankenburg as a present, with the consent of his eldest son Augustus William, insofar violating the primogeniture principle laid down by the late Duke Henry V.

When in 1707 Prince Anthony Ulrich managed to betroth Louis Rudolph's daughter Elisabeth Christine to the Habsburg archduke Charles VI, his elder brother Emperor Joseph I raised the County of Blankenburg to an immediate principality. Louis Rudolph's status as an Imperial prince (Reichsfürst), however, was limited as his vote in the Imperial Diet was not hereditary and depending on the Welf Electorate of Brunswick-Lüneburg (Calenberg line).

On the death of brother Augustus William in 1731, Louis Rudolph also inherited Wolfenbüttel, thus ruling both principalities in personal union. He relocated his residence to Wolfenbüttel, the capital of the inherited bigger principality. In the few years of his rule, Louis Rudolph managed to restore the finances, after Augustus William had almost ruined the state.

Louis Rudolph died without male issue in 1735. He was succeeded by his first cousin, Duke Ferdinand Albert II, who had married Louis Rudolph's youngest daughter, Antoinette Amalie.

Family
Louis Rudolph married Christine Louise, daughter of Albert Ernest I, Prince of Öttingen-Öttingen, at Aurich in 1690. They had four daughters, but only three reached adulthood:

 Elisabeth Christine of Brunswick-Wolfenbüttel (1691–1750), married Archduke Charles VI of Austria, crowned Holy Roman Empress in 1711, mother of Empress Maria Theresa.
 Charlotte Auguste (1692–1692)
 Charlotte Christine of Brunswick-Wolfenbüttel (1694–1715), married Tsarevich Alexei Petrovich of Russia, son and heir of Peter the Great and was mother to Emperor Peter II of Russia.
 Antoinette Amalie of Brunswick-Wolfenbüttel (14 April 1696 – 6 March 1762), married Duke Ferdinand Albert II of Brunswick-Lüneburg who succeeded her father in 1735.

Louis Rudolph's descendants include monarchs of World War I Allied Powers George V of the United Kingdom, Nicholas II of Russia, Victor Emmanuel III of Italy, Albert I of the Belgians, Ferdinand I of Romania; monarchs of the Central Powers Wilhelm II of Germany, Franz Joseph I of Austria-Hungary, Marie-Adélaïde, Grand Duchess of Luxembourg and Ferdinand I of Bulgaria; also the current monarchs of the United Kingdom, Spain, Denmark, Sweden, Norway, Netherlands and Liechtenstein. His descendants also included the last rulers of several defunct kingdoms and empires including Francis II the last Holy Roman Emperor, Charles I of Austria, Ludwig III of Bavaria, Frederick Augustus III of Saxony, William II of Württemberg, Francis II of the Two Sicilies, Michael I of Romania, Maximilian I of Mexico, Manuel II of Portugal, Pedro II of Brazil, Constantine II of Greece, Peter II of Yugoslavia, Napoleon II and Louis XVII of France.

Ancestry

References
 At the House of Welf site 

1671 births
1735 deaths
Princes of Wolfenbüttel
New House of Brunswick
Knights of Malta
Burials at Brunswick Cathedral
Military personnel from Lower Saxony
Major generals